The salt gland is an organ for excreting excess salts. It is found in the cartilaginous fishes subclass elasmobranchii (sharks, rays, and skates), seabirds, and some reptiles. Salt glands can be found in the rectum of sharks. Birds and reptiles have salt glands located in or on the skull, usually in the eyes, nose, or mouth. These glands are lobed containing many secretory tubules which radiate outward from the excretory canal at the center. Secretory tubules are lined with a single layer of epithelial cells. The diameter and length of these glands vary depending on the salt uptake of the species.

Salt glands maintain salt balance and allow marine vertebrates to drink seawater. Active transport via sodium–potassium pump, found on the basolateral membrane, moves salt from the blood into the gland, where it is excreted as a concentrated solution.

In birds 
The avian salt gland has two main ducts which are a medial and a lateral. Salt gland activations occurs from increased osmolarity in the blood, stimulating the hypothalamic information processing, sending signal through the parasympathetic nerve activating vasodilation, the release of hormones (acetylcholine and vasoactive intestinal peptide). Acetylcholine binds to the receptor on the basolateral membrane of the gland. This in turn activates calcium release in the epithelial cells, opening potassium channels (flowing potassium out of the cells) on the basolateral membrane and chloride channels on the apical membrane to flow out of the cell. Ions are moved into the epithelial cells by a Na-K-Cl cotransporter, also in the basolateral membrane. Increases in sodium opens the sodium-potassium ATPase channels, removing the excess sodium back out across the basolateral membrane and allowing for potassium to come into the cell. An electrical gradient is formed from the chloride ions, allowing sodium to be passed through the tight junctions of the epithelial cells into the salt gland along with minimal amounts of water. As well, mitochondria rich cells are associated with changes in salt concentration, increasing with higher amounts and decreasing with lower exposure, assisting in the movement of salts. These glands excrete the hypertonic sodium-chloride (with few other ions) by the stimulus of central and peripheral osmoreceptors and volume receptors.

In reptiles 
The need for salt excretion in reptiles (such as marine iguanas and sea turtles) and birds (such as petrels and albatrosses) reflects their having much less efficient kidneys than mammals. Unlike the skin of amphibians, that of reptiles and birds is impermeable to salt, preventing its release.

The evolution of a salt gland in early reptiles and birds allowed them to eat aquatic plants and animals with high salt concentrations.  This evolutionary development does not account for the gland in elasmobranchs, suggesting convergent evolution.

Some theories suggest mammalian tear ducts and sweat glands may be evolutionarily related to salt glands. While human tears are high in potassium, most phylogeneticists disagree with the association.

See also

Halotolerance
Lacrimal gland
Osmoregulation
Supraorbital gland

References

Further reading
Evans, D. H.  1993.  Osmotic and Ionic Regulation. pp. 315–336. In Evans, D. H.  1993. The Physiology of Fishes.  CRC Press, Boca Raton, Florida.
Goldstein, D. L.  2002.  Water and Salt Balance in Seabirds. pp. 467–480. In Schreiber, E. A. and J. Burger. (eds.) 2002.  Biology of Marine Birds. CRC Press, Boca Raton, Florida.
Schmidt-Nielsen, K.  1959.  Salt Glands. pp. 221–226. In Wessells, N. K. (comp.) 1974. Vertebrate Structures and Functions. W. H. Freeman and Company, San Francisco, CA.
Wǖrsig, B. G., T. A. Jefferson and D. J. Schmidly.  2000.  The Marine Mammals of the Gulf of Mexico. Texas A&M Press, College Station, TX.

Glands
Vertebrate anatomy